"Sweetest Pie" is a song by American rapper Megan Thee Stallion and English-Albanian singer Dua Lipa, released on March 11, 2022 through 1501 Certified and 300 Entertainment. The song serves as the lead single from Megan Thee Stallion's second studio album Traumazine.

Background, release and lyrics
In June 2021, Megan Thee Stallion expressed her interest in doing a collaboration with Dua Lipa. Lipa responded on Instagram saying she would love to do a collaboration with Megan Thee Stallion. Megan Thee Stallion and Lipa began teasing the collaboration in February 2022 after the latter artist addressed the former as "thee sweetest pie" when sending her a pie for her birthday. That same month, Megan Thee Stallion teased that her next single would be with someone her fans might have guessed before and it was a song unexpected for her and "different".

On March 6, 2022, Megan Thee Stallion and Lipa formally announced their collaboration. The former released a promotional image of the two artists' faces iced onto cakes while the latter shared a 5-second snippet of the track accompanied by a video of a text conversation between the two in which they shared images of them together. They revealed the cover art and title as "Sweetest Pie" the following day. The track was released on March 11, 2022. The remixes EP by David Guetta was released on April 22.

Commercial performance
In the US, "Sweetest Pie" debuted at number 15 on the Billboard Hot 100, becoming Lipa's highest debut on the chart, her sixth top 20 single and Megan Thee Stallion's eighth. The song also charted in the top 20 in Canada and Ireland. On the 
UK Singles Chart, "Sweetest Pie" entered at number 31 with first-week sales of 12,344 units.

Music video
The music video for "Sweetest Pie" accompanied the song's release and was directed by Dave Meyers, with a concept created by Megan Thee Stallion. The music video is inspired by "Hansel and Gretel" by "welcoming a duo of unsuspecting men into their lair — ultimately luring them to their deaths."

Live performances
On March 15, 2022, Lipa brought out Megan Thee Stallion during her Future Nostalgia Tour at Ball Arena in Denver, Colorado to perform the collaboration. This marks the first time they performed the song live together. Megan Thee Stallion also performed "Sweetest Pie" at the 2022 iHeartRadio Music Awards on March 22, and at the Coachella Valley Music and Arts Festival on April 16.

Track listing

 Digital download and streaming
 "Sweetest Pie" – 3:21

 Digital download and streaming – David Guetta remixes
 "Sweetest Pie" (David Guetta dance remix) – 2:23
 "Sweetest Pie" (David Guetta festival remix) – 3:00
 "Sweetest Pie" (David Guetta dance remix extended) – 3:14
 "Sweetest Pie" (David Guetta festival remix extended) – 3:56

Personnel
Credits adapted from Qobuz.

 Megan Thee Stallion vocals
 Dua Lipa vocals
 Romano production
 OG Parker production
 Platinum Library production
 Koz additional production
 Shawn "Source" Jarrett vocal recording engineer
 Mark Shick vocal recording engineer
 Mike Dean mixing, mastering

Charts

Weekly charts

Year-end charts

Certifications

Release history

Awards and nominations

References

2022 singles
2022 songs
300 Entertainment singles
Dua Lipa songs
Megan Thee Stallion songs
Music videos directed by Dave Meyers (director)
Pop-rap songs
Songs written by Megan Thee Stallion
Songs written by Dua Lipa
Songs written by Clarence Coffee Jr.
Songs written by OG Parker
Songs written by Nija Charles
Songs written by Sarah Hudson (singer)
Songs written by Koz (musician)
Works based on Hansel and Gretel